The Sydney Catchment Authority was a statutory authority of the Government of New South Wales created in 1999 to manage and protect drinking water catchments and catchment infrastructure, and supplies bulk water to its customers, including Sydney Water and a number of local government authorities in the state of New South Wales, Australia.

The authority was led by its Chief Executive, who reported to the Board of the authority that was ultimately responsible to the Minister for Primary Industries and Minister for Regional Water.

From 1 January 2015, the Sydney Catchment Authority joined with State Water to form WaterNSW, a single organisation responsible for managing bulk water supply across the State.

Objectives of the authority
The objectives of the authority are:
 	to manage and protect the catchment area and catchment infrastructure to promote water quality
 	to protect public health and safety, and the environment
 	to ensure that the water it supplies is of appropriate quality
 	to operate according to the principles of ecologically sustainable development
 	to efficiently and economically manage catchment infrastructure works.

The SCA's customers then filter the water the SCA supplies and distribute it to households, businesses and other users. More than four and a half million people, about 60 percent of the NSW population, use water supplied by the SCA.

See also

 Warragamba Dam
 Upper Nepean Scheme
 Shoalhaven Scheme
 Woronora Dam
 Blue Mountains Dams
 Prospect Reservoir

References

 Sydney Water Catchment Management Act 1998

External links
Official website Sydney Catchment Authority
a map of the catchment areas around Sydney

Defunct government entities of New South Wales
Government agencies established in 1999
Government agencies disestablished in 2015
Water management in New South Wales
Government of Sydney
1999 establishments in Australia
2015 disestablishments in Australia